John Barkley Rosser Sr. (December 6, 1907 – September 5, 1989) was an American logician, a student of Alonzo Church, and known for his part in the Church–Rosser theorem, in lambda calculus. He also developed what is now called the "Rosser sieve", in number theory. He was part of the mathematics department at Cornell University from 1936 to 1963, chairing it several times. He was later director of the Army Mathematics Research Center at the University of Wisconsin–Madison and the first director of the Communications Research Division of IDA. Rosser also authored mathematical textbooks.

In 1936, he proved Rosser's trick, a stronger version of Gödel's first incompleteness theorem, showing that the requirement for ω-consistency may be weakened to consistency.  Rather than using the liar paradox sentence equivalent to "I am not provable," he used a sentence that stated "For every proof of me, there is a shorter proof of my negation".

In prime number theory, he proved Rosser's theorem.

The Kleene–Rosser paradox showed that the original lambda calculus was inconsistent.

Rosser died of an aneurysm September 5, 1989, at his home in Madison, Wisconsin.

Rosser's son, John Barkley Rosser Jr., was a mathematical economist and professor at James Madison University in Harrisonburg, Virginia.

Selected publications
A mathematical logic without variables by John Barkley Rosser, Univ. Diss. Princeton, NJ 1934, p. 127–150, 328–355
Logic for mathematicians by John B. Rosser, McGraw-Hill 1953; 2nd ed., Chelsea Publ. Co. 1978, 578 p., 
 Highlights of the History of Lambda calculus, by J. Barkley Rosser, Annals of the History of Computing, 1984, vol	 6, n 4, pp. 337–349
 Simplified Independence Proofs: Boolean Valued Models of Set Theory, by J. Barkley Rosser, Academic Press, 1969
 See Barkley Rosser papers for a complete list of Rosser's publications.

References

External links

Interview with Rosser and Stephen Kleene about their experiences at Princeton

1907 births
1989 deaths
People from Jacksonville, Florida
American logicians
20th-century American mathematicians
Princeton University alumni
Cornell University faculty
University of Wisconsin–Madison faculty
Presidents of the Society for Industrial and Applied Mathematics